Johannes Willem "Jan Willem" van den Hondel (born 24 July 1957 in Gouda) is a sailor from the Netherlands. Since the Netherlands boycotted the Moscow Olympic Games Van den Hondel represented his National Olympic Committee at the 1980 Summer Olympics, which several countries boycotted, in Tallinn, USSR under the Dutch NOC flag. With Henk van Gent as helmsman, Van den Hondel took the 4th place in the 470.

Sources
 
 
 
 
 
 
 
 

Living people
1957 births
Sportspeople from Gouda, South Holland
Dutch male sailors (sport)

Sailors at the 1980 Summer Olympics – 470
Olympic sailors of the Netherlands
20th-century Dutch people